Adam Lewis "A.L." Bingaman (February 11, 1793 - September 6, 1869) studied law in Massachusetts, graduating with a Bachelor of Arts, Harvard University Class of 1812. While in Boston he met and married Julia Maria Murray, daughter of Judith Sargent Murray, feminist, poet, and writer of the Universalist Church in America.

Plantation life 
Murray and her daughter went to live at Fatherland, the Bingaman family plantation in Natchez, Mississippi. Life on the plantation was privileged. The noted race horse, Lexington (horse) was stabled at the Bingaman plantation while being trained by John Benjamin Pryor, the horse trainer at the top of his field. Bingaman was a slaveholder, holding 230 slaves in 1850 and 310 in 1860. Bingaman had a relationship with a free-black woman, Mary E. Williams, and may have fathered as many as six children: Frances Ann, wife of Pryor; Cordelia, Emilie, Marie Sophie Charlotte, James and Henriette.

Orator and political life 
As a member of the Mississippi House of Representatives in 1833, Bingaman headed a select committee during the Nullification Crisis that preceded the American Civil War.  He served as the president of the State Senate from 1838 to 1840. Bingaman was described by his peers as "a man of rare qualifications for a popular leader, being gifted by nature in mind and personal appearance (which was most dignified and commanding), with a polished education and fascinating manners; he was a natural orator." After Charles Lynch was elected governor of Mississippi, Bingaman read Lynch's inaugural speech to the Mississippi Assembly. Bingaman's reputation as an orator was heightened by his speech to General Andrew Jackson at Natchez in January 1840.

References 

1790 births
1869 deaths
Harvard University alumni
Mississippi state senators
Members of the Mississippi House of Representatives
Speakers of the Mississippi House of Representatives
19th-century American politicians